Clemente Rebora (6 January 1885 – 1 November 1957) was a poet from Milan, Italy. From 1913 to 1922, he wrote anonymous "Songs" and lyrics. Previously an atheist, he had a spiritual crisis in 1928 and became a devout Catholic. In 1930, he entered a seminary; in 1936, he became a Rosminian priest. After this, his work became religious in orientation, but his work is popular beyond Catholic circles for its treatment of metaphysics and physics. He is somewhat controversial for his friendship with Julius Evola, but the friendship seems to have been largely based on his hope Julius would convert to Christianity. When this hope grew dim the friendship declined.

References

External links
Biography in Italian

1885 births
1957 deaths
Catholic poets
Converts to Roman Catholicism from atheism or agnosticism
Italian male poets
Italian Roman Catholics
Writers from Milan
20th-century Italian poets
20th-century Italian male writers
Clergy from Milan